is a Japanese adult visual novel developed by Moonstone which was released on August 24, 2007 playable on Windows as a DVD. An all ages version of Clear, published by Sweets, was released on February 19, 2009 for the PlayStation 2. Clear is Moonstone's sixth game; Moonstone has also developed Gift. The gameplay in Clear follows a plot line which offers pre-determined scenarios with courses of interaction, and focuses on the appeal of the five female main characters. Moonstone later released a fan disc titled Clear: Crystal Stories in May 2008.

Before the game's release, a manga based on the story, drawn by Japanese artist Yukiwo, was serialized in the seinen magazine Comp Ace. An illustrated story of Clear serialized in the Dengeki Hime magazine. Other media such as an image song single, a vocal mini album, drama CDs, and a short story collection called Clear Short Stories were produced.

Gameplay
Clear is a romance visual novel in which the player assumes the role of Kōichi Yukino. Its gameplay mainly consists of reading and progressing through the story's narrative and dialogue. The game's text is accompanied by character sprites, which represent who Kōichi is talking to, appearing on top of background artwork. Throughout the game, the player encounters CG artwork at certain points in the story, which take the place of the regular background art and character sprites. Clear follows a branching plot line with nonlinear sequences and multiple endings, where the plot's direction is affected by the player's decisions.

The gameplay requires little interaction from the player as most of the duration of the game is spent on simply reading the text that will appear on the screen; this text represents either dialogue between the various characters, or the inner thoughts of the protagonist. Every so often, the player will come to a "decision point" where they are given the chance to choose from options that are displayed on the screen, typically two to three at a time. During these times, gameplay pauses until a choice is made that furthers the plot in a specific direction, depending on which choice the player makes. There are five main plot lines that the player will have the chance to experience, one for each of the five heroines in the story. In order to view the five plot lines to their entirety, the player will have to replay the game multiple times and choose different choices during the decision points in order to further the plot in an alternate direction. Throughout gameplay, there are scenes depicting Kōichi and a given heroine having sexual intercourse.

Plot and characters
Clear'''s story is set on the island Harukajima. , the protagonist, used to live on the island, but moved to Tokyo as a child. Kōichi comes back from Tokyo to this very ordinary and small island off the coast from mainland Japan and lives with his grandfather. When he returns, a part of his childhood memory on the island is missing. Kōichi is not a normal human; he is a type of blood-sucking vampire, though he cannot attack people, due to a certain rule. He came to attend his current school because this secret was exposed in his old town on an island offshore Japan. Kōichi has a younger female cousin called . After her parents died, she was adopted into his family as his sister. After her brother transfers schools, she does as well so she can still go to the same school as him. Nonoka, otherwise known as Nono, works as a maid at Kōichi's house, though she often makes many mistakes. She has amnesia so has become a live-in maid until she can remember anything about her old life.

Kōichi has a childhood friend named . She has a graceful personality, and is thought to be very beautiful. She belongs to the Volunteer Club which makes her popular around town. She is also skilled at Aikido. Clear features two other main female characters, one being . Haruno is an apprentice miko at a shrine, though this is only something that is part-time. She is haunted by a ghost, and became an apprentice miko so she could figure out how to get rid of it. Despite this, she usually has a cheerful personality. Due to Sayu's youthful personality and appearance, she is often mistaken for a child. She always carries around a small doll named Sayurin designed to look similar to her.

Development and release
Planning and scenario was headed by Kure, whilst Mitha and Endori worked on character designs. CG artwork was handled by four people, Kayaka, Udonko, Yamakaze, and Hinata Nao, background artwork was provided by Sazanka. The creation of background music (BGM) in Clear was undertook by a music production company called Angel Note, and Itsuya Mizunoto worked as Clear's animator. The game was produced by Hotaru Koizumi.Clear was first introduced in Japan, in limited and regular editions, on August 24, 2007 as a DVD playable on a Windows PC. The limited edition came bundled with three additional gifts: a rectangular clock with an image of Miki looking out on a beach, a hardcover illustration book with images from the game, a drama CD which came with the book, and a two-disc original soundtrack. An all ages version of Clear, titled , was released on February 19, 2009 for the PlayStation 2 by Sweets. On May 3, 2008, Moonstone released a fan disc titled  for Windows PCs as a DVD. In the fan disc, all six heroines receive their own new story.

Related media
Printed media
A manga, under the title , was serialized in Kadokawa Shoten's Japanese seinen magazine Comp Ace between June 26, 2007 and May 26, 2008. Despite the manga being released before the visual novel, the story is based on the game and is illustrated by Japanese artist Yukiwo. The first bound volume was released on March 26, 2008, and the second followed on June 26, 2008.

An illustrated story, with the general title , serialized in ASCII Media Works' Dengeki Hime magazine between the May and July issues in 2007. A single short story collection entitled Clear Short Stories is written by Nikaidō Kageyama and was first published in Japan by Harvest in February 2008 with Miki and Sayu on the cover drawn by the staff of Moonstone. An art book entitled Clear Visual Fan Book was published by Ichijinsha on April 26, 2008 with Miki and Natsuki on the cover.

Music and audio CDs
The game has two ending themes: "Crystal Love" sung by Kazko, and "Brilliant Days" by Riryka. There are also three insert songs: "Bitter sweet pain" by Haruka Shimotsuki,  by Rekka Katakiri, and "One-way Shining" by Chata. The first music single for the visual novel, entitled "Perfect Tears", was released on May 23, 2007 in Japan as an image song single by Lantis; this single contained an image song, and a remix of the game's opening theme. The game's original soundtrack was released with the limited edition version of the game; the soundtrack contained two discs, along with two bonus drama tracks. A vocal mini album was released on September 26, 2007 by Lantis containing the opening theme, both ending themes, and the three insert songs featured in the visual novel. A free drama CD entitled  was distributed at Clear promotional events in Osaka and Tokyo, Japan in May and June 2007. Another drama CD was released by Lantis on May 9, 2008, containing fourteen drama tracks.

Reception
On Getchu.com, a major redistributor of visual novel and domestic anime products, Clear'' ranked at No. 3 in the PC sales ranking of August 2007. The game charted further at No. 23 in the PC sales ranking of 2007.

References

External links
Clear official website 
Clear PS2 official website 

2007 video games
2008 Japanese novels
Bishōjo games
Drama anime and manga
Eroge
Fantasy anime and manga
Fantasy video games
Harem anime and manga
Japan-exclusive video games
Manga based on video games
2007 manga
PlayStation 2 games
Romance anime and manga
Romance video games
School life in anime and manga
Seinen manga
Video games developed in Japan
Visual novels
Windows games
Moonstone (company) games